True Market Value is a term commonly used for a Real Estate e-auctions or online auction, as it creates transparency for the buyers and ensure that the seller maximises the price of the property to the true market value. The transparency creates a fair deal for all parties and is auditable if any twists around the deal should arise.

History 
The concept is still not widely spread in the real-estate business, as it has only really been used from 2010 and onwards. From 2010 to 2014 there are some Lead User companies who have used this for their corporate real estate divestments. One example is A.P. Moller Maersk Group, who successfully have done this in North America, Latin America, and Europe.

The Concept 
Buyers of real-estate are often presented with a situation where multiple buyers are interested in the same property. 

This creates uncertainties that can be split into:
 Are there really other buyers?
 What price is the winning price?
 How many offers and time is needed?

By utilising a forward e-auction for the conclusion of the sales process and deal only real and approved buyers participate, so no faking another bid or bluff is needed, which removes one of the uncertainties for the buyer. 
During the online auction the buyer can see the lead bid and will be able to adjust it as the auction progresses, therefore the winning price will be clear for all and the buyer will not have to guess what offers is the right to win. 
The time spend is usually not more than a couple of hours which means that if the auction is not won, the time spend is much lower compared to the conventional negotiations. The fact that it is an online auction the bidding can be done in front of any computer which minimises travel time to and from the real estate agent.

Most common approach is to use a 3rd party consultant to ensure that the real estate agent can prove that the process have been conducted fair and that ethics of the online auction is maintained.

References

Real estate valuation